David Elliot Grann (born March 10, 1967) is an American journalist, a staff writer for The New Yorker magazine, and a best-selling author.

His first book, The Lost City of Z: A Tale of Deadly Obsession in the Amazon, was published by Doubleday in February 2009. After its first week of publication, it debuted on The New York Times bestseller list at #4 and later reached #1. Grann's articles have been collected in several anthologies, including What We Saw: The Events of September 11, 2001, The Best American Crime Writing of 2004 and 2005, and The Best American Sports Writing of 2003 and 2006. He has written for The New York Times Magazine, The Atlantic, The Washington Post, The Wall Street Journal, and The Weekly Standard. 

According to a profile in Slate, Grann has a reputation as a "workhorse reporter", which has made him a popular journalist who "inspires a devotion in readers that can border on the obsessive."

Early life 
Grann was born on March 10, 1967, to Phyllis and Victor Grann. His mother is the former CEO of Putnam Penguin and the first woman CEO of a major publishing firm. His father is an oncologist and Director of the Bennett Cancer Center in Stamford, Connecticut. Grann has two siblings, Edward and Alison.

Career
He graduated from Connecticut College in 1989 with a B.A. in Government. While still in college, Grann received a Thomas J. Watson Fellowship and conducted research in Mexico, where he began his career as a freelance journalist. 

He received a master's degree in international relations from the Fletcher School of Law and Diplomacy at Tufts University in 1993. At that point primarily interested in fiction, Grann hoped to develop a career as a novelist.

In 1994 he was hired as a copy editor at The Hill, a Washington, D.C.-based newspaper covering the United States Congress. The same year, Grann earned a master's degree in creative writing from Boston University, where he taught courses in creative writing and fiction. He was named The Hill's executive editor in 1995. In 1996, Grann became a senior editor at The New Republic. He joined The New Yorker in 2003 as a staff writer. He was a finalist for the Michael Kelly Award in 2005.

In 2009, he received both the George Polk Award and Sigma Delta Chi Award for his New Yorker piece "Trial By Fire", about Cameron Todd Willingham. Another New Yorker investigative article, "The Mark of a Masterpiece", raised questions about the methods of Peter Paul Biro, who claimed to use fingerprints to help authenticate lost masterpieces. Biro sued Grann and The New Yorker for libel, but the case was summarily dismissed. The article was a finalist for the 2010 National Magazine Award.

The Lost City of Z 
Grann's 2009 non-fiction book The Lost City of Z: A Tale of Deadly Obsession in the Amazon recounts the odyssey of the notable British explorer, Captain Percy Fawcett who, in 1925, disappeared with his son in the Amazon while looking for the Lost City of Z. For decades, explorers and scientists have tried to find evidence of both his party and the Lost City of Z. Grann also trekked into the Amazon. In his book, he reveals new evidence about how Fawcett died and shows that "Z" may have existed.

Other books
An anthology of twelve previously published Grann essays, The Devil and Sherlock Holmes: Tales of Murder, Madness, and Obsession, was published in March 2010.

In March 2014, Grann said he was working on a new book about the Osage Indian murders, considered "one of the most sinister crimes in American history." His book Killers of the Flower Moon: An American Crime and the Birth of the FBI was published in 2017, chronicling "a tale of murder, betrayal, heroism and a nation's struggle to leave its frontier culture behind and enter the modern world." It was a finalist for the 2017 National Book Award and later became #1 on The New York Times bestseller list.

Film adaptations
 The Lost City of Z (2017)
The Lost City of Z: A Tale of Deadly Obsession in the Amazon was the first novel by Grann to be adapted into a film, optioned in 2008 by Brad Pitt's Plan B production company and Paramount Pictures. The film was released in 2017, directed by James Gray and starred Charlie Hunnam, Robert Pattinson, Sienna Miller, and Tom Holland.

 The Old Man & the Gun (2018)
Grann's second film adaptation featured a script loosely based on Grann's 2003 article of the same name in The New Yorker (later collected in his 2010 book The Devil and Sherlock Holmes). Written and directed by  David Lowery, the film stars Robert Redford, Casey Affleck, Danny Glover, Tika Sumpter, Tom Waits and Sissy Spacek. It was released in 2018.

 Killers of the Flower Moon (2023)
The book was acquired for film adaptation by director Martin Scorsese in 2017. Starring Leonardo DiCaprio, Robert De Niro, Jesse Plemons, and Lily Gladstone, the film is set to be released theatrically by Paramount Pictures and stream on Apple TV+ in 2023. 

 The White Darkness (forthcoming)
Apple TV+ announced in April 2022 that Grann's book The White Darkness would be developed into a new limited series starring Tom Hiddleston. The series will be developed by Soo Hugh and co-produced by Apple Studios and UCP.

 The Wager: A Tale of Shipwreck, Mutiny, and Murder (forthcoming)
In July 2022, Scorsese and DiCaprio also acquired the rights to Grann's upcoming non-fiction book, The Wager: A Tale of Shipwreck, Mutiny, and Murder.

Personal life 
Grann has two children. As of 2017 he resided in New York.

Awards
 1989 Thomas J. Watson Fellowship
 2005 (finalist) Michael Kelly award
 2009 George Polk Awards
 2009 Sigma Delta Chi Award
 2009 (shortlist) Samuel Johnson Prize
 2010 (finalist) National Magazine Awards
 2013 Cullman Fellowship
 2017 (finalist) National Book Award

Bibliography

Books
 
 
 
  Based on the New Yorker article of the same name.

Essays and reporting
 "The Selling of the Scandal", The New Republic, September 28, 1998.
 "The Stasi and the Swan – The last spy story of the cold war." The New Republic, April 19, 1999.
 "Crimetown USA – The city that fell in love with the mob.", The New Republic, July 10, 2000.
 "Giving "The Devil" His Due", The Atlantic Monthly, June 2001.
 "Which Way Did He Run?", The New York Times Magazine, January 13, 2002.
 "Baseball Without Metaphor", The New York Times Magazine, September 1, 2002.
 "The Old Man and the Gun – Forrest Tucker had a long career robbing banks, and he wasn't willing to retire", The New Yorker, January 27, 2003.
 "The Price of Power", The New York Times Magazine, May 11, 2003.
 "City of Water – Can an intricate and antiquated maze of tunnels continue to sustain New York?", The New Yorker, September 1, 2003.
 "The Brand – How the Aryan Brotherhood became the most murderous prison gang in America", The New Yorker, February 16, 2004.
 "The Squid Hunter – Can Steve O'Shea capture the sea's most elusive creature", The New Yorker, May 24, 2004.
 "Inside Dope – Mark Halperin and the transformation of the Washington establishment", The New Yorker, October 25, 2004.
 "Mysterious Circumstances – The strange death of a Sherlock Holmes fanatic", The New Yorker, December 13, 2004.
 "Stealing Time – What makes Rickey Henderson run?", The New Yorker, September 12, 2005.
 "The Lost City of Z – A quest to uncover the secrets of the Amazon", The New Yorker September 19, 2005.
 "True Crime – A postmodern murder mystery", The New Yorker, February 11, 2008.
 "The Chameleon – The many lives of Frédéric Bourdin", The New Yorker, August 11, 2008.
 "The Fall – John McCain's choices", The New Yorker, November 17, 2008.
 "Trial by Fire – Did Texas execute an innocent man?", The New Yorker, September 7, 2009.
  "The Mark of a Masterpiece" – The man who keeps finding famous fingerprints on uncelebrated works of art, The New Yorker, July 12 & 19, 2010.
 
 "The Yankee Comandante – A story of love, revolution, and betrayal", The New Yorker, May 28, 2012.
 "The Marked Woman – How an Osage Indian family became the prime target of one of the most sinister crimes in American history", The New Yorker, March 1, 2017.

References

External links

 David Grann, official website
 Articles by David Grann at The New Yorker
 

1967 births
Living people
Place of birth missing (living people)
American male journalists
American non-fiction writers
Connecticut College alumni
The New Yorker staff writers
Journalists from New York City
Anthony Award winners